Poove Pen Poove is a 2001 Tamil-language romantic drama film directed by K. Purushotaman. The film stars Ishaq Hussaini and Abitha, while Ponnambalam and Raviraj appear in supporting roles. Featuring music composed by Subash Jawahar, the film was released on 20 July 2001.

Cast
Ishaq Hussaini
Abitha
Ponnambalam
Raviraj
Prathap Chandran
Chaplin Balu
V. Rahul
Devipriya
N. Prabhakar

Soundtrack
Soundtrack was composed by Subash Jawahar.
"Adi Raappakala" — Krishnaraj, Anuradha Venkat
"Kannukuley" — Unni Menon, Lalitha
"Ettu Kaalu" —  Krishnaraj, Venkat Prabhu
"Hello Party" — Sevaththa Sampath, Anuradha Sriram
"Killu Pulla" — Rengababu, Gandhi Kumar
"Millennium" — Yugendran, Thilaka
"Coca-Cola" — Ishaq Hussaini, Suriya Doss

Release
The film did not perform well at the box office, though the lead actor Ishaq Hussaini stated the film's reception was greater in Southern Tamil Nadu. The project marked Abitha's return to films following the release of Sethu (1999), but none of her subsequent films replicated the success of Sethu,

References

2001 films
2000s Tamil-language films
Indian drama films
2001 directorial debut films